Isla Mata la Gata is a mangrove island and tourist attraction,  located off the southwest coast of Puerto Rico. Closest access from the island is by boat from the coastal village of La Parguera, in Lajas. Available facilities include dock, picnic tables, open air shelters, changing cabanas and commodes. Activities include sunbathing, swimming, snorkelling, picnicking, fishing.

References

Islands of Puerto Rico
Tourist attractions in Puerto Rico